Brasserie Montmartre was a French, and later Mediterranean, restaurant and jazz club in Portland, Oregon, in the United States.

Description and history

Brasserie Montmartre was a restaurant and jazz club that operated three different times in Portland, Oregon. The original restaurant, which featured French cuisine, opened in 1978 and was described by The Oregonian as having "customer-drawn crayon art on the walls, black-and-white checkered floors, nightly jazz and a solid food menu". It closed in 2006.

New owners Matt and Sara Maletis, who were longtime Portland residents, re-opened the French restaurant in 2009. The couple signed a twenty-year lease and spent nearly $1 million renovating its interior. However, Brasserie was closed a year and a half later, in 2011.

Carl Coffman, the building owner, and chefs Pascal Chureau and Michael Hanaghan re-opened the restaurant for a third time in May 2012. Coffman and Chureau had purchased the restaurant in the spring of 2011. According to The Oregonian, the most recent iteration of Brasserie served "accessible French food with a relaxed vibe". In 2012, Chureau sold his share of the business and the restaurant's menu began offering more Mediterranean cuisine options. It closed for the third time on April 30, 2015.

Reception
Brasserie was known for featuring roving musicians. According to Eater's Danielle Centoni, Chureau's iteration of Brasserie received "good marks for solid, classic, French brasserie fare, including flights of frites fried in a range of fats". The third and final iteration of the restaurant received mostly positive reviews.

See also
 List of defunct restaurants of the United States
 List of French restaurants
 List of jazz venues in the United States

References

External links

 

1978 establishments in Oregon
2006 disestablishments in Oregon
2009 establishments in Oregon
2011 disestablishments in Oregon
2012 establishments in Oregon
2015 disestablishments in Oregon
Defunct French restaurants in Portland, Oregon
Defunct jazz clubs in the United States
Defunct Mediterranean restaurants
Defunct music venues in Portland, Oregon
Jazz clubs in Oregon
Mediterranean restaurants in Oregon
Restaurants disestablished in 2006
Restaurants disestablished in 2011
Restaurants disestablished in 2015
Restaurants established in 1978
Restaurants established in 2011
Restaurants established in 2012
Southwest Portland, Oregon